Joseph Christopher Holligan (29 January 1886 – 21 May 1915) was an Australian rules footballer who played with Geelong in the Victorian Football League (VFL).

Holligan worked as a shunter at the Geelong railway yards and was killed in an accident on 21 May 1915 when he was struck by a train.

Notes

External links 

1886 births
1915 deaths
Australian rules footballers from Victoria (Australia)
Geelong Football Club players
Northcote Football Club players
Accidental deaths in Victoria (Australia)
Railway accident deaths in Australia